Darin Binning (born May 5, 1966) is an American biathlete. He competed in the 20 km individual event at the 1988 Winter Olympics.

References

1966 births
Living people
American male biathletes
Olympic biathletes of the United States
Biathletes at the 1988 Winter Olympics
People from Rock Springs, Wyoming